Far-right politics in New Zealand has been present in New Zealand in the form of the organised advocacy of fascist, far-right, neo-Nazi, white supremacist, and anti-Semitic views by various groups, although fascism has never gained a strong foothold.

Early anti-Semitism
As in most Western societies, a certain amount of anti-Semitic feeling has been present in New Zealand for quite some time. This feeling was not particularly strong, however, as evidenced by the fact that Julius Vogel, a practising Jew, was able to become Premier in 1873. Vogel did, however, suffer jibes about his faith, and political cartoonists frequently employed various Jewish stereotypes against him. The fact that he served as treasurer was particularly played upon, with stereotypes of Jewish bankers and moneylenders being brought out. However, none of this anti-Semitism was conducted in an organised fashion, being simply the views of individuals rather than any sort of political movement.

New Zealander Arthur Desmond, "possibly the most widely read and influential political writer New Zealand has ever produced", incorporated anti-semitism into his writing, particularly his 1896 political treatise Might Is Right. Numerous editions of the book have been printed and it found new popularity with neo-Nazi groups in the 21st century.

20th century

In the early 20th century, another more disciplined strain of anti-Semitism crystallised around the social credit theory. This theory, set out by the British engineer C. H. Douglas, was highly critical of bankers and financiers, believing that debt was being used to undermine people's rights. While by no means all creditists were anti-Semitic, the complaints made by Social Credit fit well with existing anti-Semitic theories that Jews controlled financial institutions. As such, many anti-Semites gathered around social credit organisations, and in some cases, became powerful.

Initially, most supporters of social credit were supporters of the Labour Party, which meant that any anti-Semitic sentiments were considerably diluted. Later, however, an independent Social Credit Party was founded, and some allege that the new group contained many anti-Semitic elements. Gradually, rifts emerged in the party over anti-Semitic views, and the faction opposed to anti-Semitism was victorious. By the late 1960s, any anti-Semitic strain had been virtually expelled from the Social Credit Party. Many anti-Semites supported the League of Rights, an organisation originating in Australia which also had links to the social credit movement.

Unlike some countries, New Zealand did not have any notable fascist organisations in the first half of the 20th century, although the New Zealand Legion was sometimes accused of having fascist leanings. There were no real equivalents to the British Union of Fascists or the Silver Legion of America, although certain individuals, notably Lionel Terry and Arthur Nelson Field, promoted white supremacist ideals.

In the post-war period, however, a number of fascist organisations became active. In 1968, the fascist activist Colin King-Ansell was jailed for an attack on a synagogue. The following year, he established the National Socialist Party of New Zealand, and contested a number of elections under its banner. Later, he led a group called the National Socialist White People's Party, modelled after the party established by George Lincoln Rockwell in the United States. In 1979, King-Ansell was fined for breaching the Race Relations Act by distributing several thousand anti-Semitic leaflets.

Another allegedly fascist group established in this period was the New Zealand National Front (NZNF). The National Front was established by Brian Thompson of Ashburton in 1968, although its initial operations were erratic. Eventually, in 1989, a new organisation called the Conservative Front (founded by Anton Foljambe) absorbed the National Front and adopted its name. The now-defunct New Zealand Democratic Nationalist Party also dates from this time period.

In 1981, a group called the New Force was founded. One of its founders and a member of its directorates was Kerry Bolton, who was also involved in the NZNF. In 1983, the New Force was renamed the Nationalist Workers Party.

In 1981, a visit by South Africa's rugby team generated huge controversy due to South Africa's apartheid policies at the time. Colin King-Ansell and a number of other fascist figures took part in counter-demonstrations against anti-tour protesters.

In the 1990s, there was something of a resurgence in New Zealand fascism. A number of gangs with fascist views, notably Unit 88, gained considerable public attention. Colin King-Ansell was once again involved, although he distanced himself from Unit 88 when the media focused on it. Later, in March 1997, King-Ansell founded the New Zealand Fascist Union, which described itself as being more closely modelled on Mussolini's Italy and Perón's Argentina than on Nazi Germany. The Fascist Union at one time claimed to have 500 members, the necessary number for official party registration, but the Union was never registered.

Also in 1997, Anton Foljambe resigned as leader of the National Front. Kyle Chapman resigned as leader in May 2005, and he and Foljambe have since established the moderate National Democrats Party. Kyle Chapman has established the Right Wing Resistance (RWR), an openly White Pride skinhead organization. The RWR has been distributing pamphlets throughout Christchurch, Auckland, Hastings, Nelson, Invercargill, Wellington and Palmerston North. RWR join with the National Front and small organisations at demonstrations. The introduction of black uniforms along the lines of Fascist Italy and the British Union of Fascists is now in place.

21st century
Foljambe resigned from the National Democrats Party in 2007 and since then the party has been defunct.

Brenton Harrison Tarrant, the Australian-born perpetrator of the Christchurch mosque shootings at Al Noor Mosque and Linwood Islamic Centre in Christchurch, New Zealand, was an admitted fascist who followed eco-fascism and admired Oswald Mosley, the leader of the British fascist organization British Union of Fascists (BUF), who is also quoted in the shooter's manifesto The Great Replacement (named after the French far-right theory of the same name).

According to the sociologist Paul Spoonley, some notable far right groups in New Zealand as of 2020 have included the neo-nazi body-builder group Wargus Christi, the White nationalist Dominion Movement and Action Zealandia groups. 

According to a Stuff report, an alleged co-founder of the Dominion Movement was a New Zealand Defence Force soldier named Johann Wolfe, who is facing court martial for sharing information with an undisclosed group. Action Zealandia is the successor to the Dominion Movement, which has opposed alleged Chinese political influence in New Zealand, the Global Compact for Migration, and denied the indigeneity of Māori to New Zealand. According to Newsroom journalist Marc Daalder, Action Zealandia was linked to at least three potential crimes in March 2020 including a member named Sam Brittenden making an online threat against the Al Noor Mosque in Christchurch, posting a leaked New Zealand Police Financial Intelligence unit document, and alleged plans to start a terror cell and purchase weapons from like-minded groups such as the Atomwaffen Division.

In August 2021 Critic Te Arohi reported an under-cover investigation of Action Zealandia, including their plans to infiltrate the New Zealand National and New Zealand Social Credit parties and planning to appeal to a broader group of people.

Notable organisations and people

Organisations
National Front (1968–2019)
National Socialist Party (1969-1980)
Kiwis Against Further Immigration (1990s)
National Democrats Party (1999-2007)
Patriot Party (2005-2005)
New Zealand League of Rights
Nationalist Workers Party
Unit 88
Right Wing Resistance
Black Order
Dominion Movement (2018-2019)
Action Zealandia (2019– )
Wargus Christi

People
Colin King-Ansell (born 1947)
Kerry Bolton (born 1956)
Kelvyn Alp (born 27 March 1971)
Kyle Chapman (born 27 April 1971)

References

External links
Paparoa
Website of the National Democrats Party
Website of the National Front 
FightDemBack, a project to oppose fascist groups in Australia and New Zealand
Article in the Australia/Israel Review

 
Race relations in New Zealand
Political movements in New Zealand